Edward Roy Nesfield (7 March 1900 – 1 July 1987), educated at King’s School, Worcester,  was an English cricketer who played three first-class matches for Worcestershire just after the First World War. Two of these games were friendlies in 1919 against HK Foster's XI, while the other — Nesfield's only County Championship outing — came the following year. His highest score of 16 was made in his debut innings.

Notes

References
 
 

1900 births
1987 deaths
English cricketers
Worcestershire cricketers
People educated at King's School, Worcester
People from Armthorpe